In mathematics, a Banach manifold is a manifold modeled on Banach spaces. Thus it is a topological space in which each point has a neighbourhood homeomorphic to an open set in a Banach space (a more involved and formal definition is given below). Banach manifolds are one possibility of extending manifolds to infinite dimensions.

A further generalisation is to Fréchet manifolds, replacing Banach spaces by Fréchet spaces. On the other hand, a Hilbert manifold is a special case of a Banach manifold in which the manifold is locally modeled on Hilbert spaces.

Definition 

Let  be a set.

 each  is a bijection from  onto an open subset  of some Banach space  and for any indices   is open in 
 the crossover map

is an -times continuously differentiable function for every  that is, the th Fréchet derivative

One can then show that there is a unique topology on  such that each  is open and each  is a homeomorphism. Very often, this topological space is assumed to be a Hausdorff space, but this is not necessary from the point of view of the formal definition.

If all the Banach spaces  are equal to the same space  the atlas is called an -atlas. However, it is not a priori necessary that the Banach spaces  be the same space, or even isomorphic as topological vector spaces.

shows that  and  must indeed be isomorphic as topological vector spaces. Hence, one can without loss of generality assume that, on each connected component of  the atlas is an -atlas for some fixed 

A new chart  is called compatible with a given atlas  if the crossover map

is an -times continuously differentiable function for every  Two atlases are called compatible if every chart in one is compatible with the other atlas. Compatibility defines an equivalence relation on the class of all possible atlases on 

Examples 

 If  is a Banach space, then  is a Banach manifold with an atlas containing a single, globally-defined chart (the identity map).
 Similarly, if  is an open subset of some Banach space then  is a Banach manifold.  (See the classification theorem below.)

Classification up to homeomorphism 

A 1969 theorem of David Henderson states that every infinite-dimensional, separable, metric Banach manifold  can be embedded as an open subset of the infinite-dimensional, separable Hilbert space,  (up to linear isomorphism, there is only one such space, usually identified with ). In fact, Henderson's result is stronger: the same conclusion holds for any metric manifold modeled on a separable infinite-dimensional Fréchet space.

The embedding homeomorphism can be used as a global chart for  Thus, in the infinite-dimensional, separable, metric case, the "only" Banach manifolds are the open subsets of Hilbert space.

See also

References 

 
 
 
 

Banach spaces
Differential geometry
Generalized manifolds
Manifolds
Nonlinear functional analysis
Structures on manifolds